Lucas Laplace-Palette (born 9 February 1996) is a French professional footballer who plays as a midfielder for Pau FC.

Career
Laplace-Palette made his professional debut with Pau FC in a 3–0 Ligue 2 loss to Clermont Foot on 5 December 2020.

References

External links
 
 Pau FC Profile

1996 births
Living people
Sportspeople from Pau, Pyrénées-Atlantiques
French footballers
Association football midfielders
Pau FC players
Ligue 2 players
Championnat National players
Championnat National 3 players
Footballers from Nouvelle-Aquitaine